Alfred De Bruyne (21 October 1930 – 4 February 1994) was a Belgian champion road cyclist. He won six Tour de France stages early in his career and went on to win many other Monuments and stage races.

He had a great deal of success early in his career during the Tour de France. 1953 was his first Tour, his best result was making one stage podium, on stage 5 from Dieppe to Caen. In 1954 he finished 2nd on the final stage into Paris and won three stages along the way. In 1955 he didn't win any stages, but ended up with the highest overall classification he would ever have which was 17th. In 1956 he won three stages in the first half of the Tour, but slowed a bit in the second half and couldn't add to this total. Also in 1956 he won Milan–San Remo and Liège–Bastogne–Liège, as well as the stage race Paris–Nice early in the season. In 1957 he abandoned the Tour for the first time in his career. He won both Paris–Roubaix and Paris–Tours that year. In 1958 he rode the Giro for the first time and didn't win any stages and finished 16th overall. He won Paris–Nice, Liège–Bastogne–Liège and came in the top 10 of Gent–Wevelgem, La Flèche Wallonne, Paris–Roubaix, Paris-Tours and Milan San Remo.

He also won the Challenge Desgrange-Colombo competition three years running, from 1956 to 1958. This was the forerunner of the Super Prestige, later replaced by the UCI Ranking Points List.

After his professional cycling career he went on to write several books about some of the most important Belgian cyclists of his era and became a popular TV sports commentator, a team manager, and finally a spokesman for the  cycling team.

Major results

1954
Tour de France:
Winner stages 8, 13 and 22
1956
Milan–San Remo
Liège–Bastogne–Liège
Paris–Nice
Tour de France:
Winner stages 1, 6 and 10
1957
Tour of Flanders
Paris–Roubaix
Paris–Tours
Six days of Ghent
1958
Liège–Bastogne–Liège
Paris–Nice
1959
Liège–Bastogne–Liège
Six days of Ghent
1961
Kuurne–Brussels–Kuurne

Books by Fred De Bruyne 
Fred de Bruyne wrote following books (in Dutch) about famous cyclists:
 Rik Van Steenbergen, 1963
 Rik Van Looy, 1963
 Patrick Sercu, 1965
 Peter Post, 1965
 De memoires van Fred De Bruyne, 1978

References

External links 

1930 births
1994 deaths
Belgian male cyclists
Belgian Tour de France stage winners
Cycling announcers
People from Berlare
Cyclists from East Flanders
Challenge Desgrange-Colombo winners